Mill Creek is a river in Otsego County, New York. It converges with the Susquehanna River southwest of Oneonta.

References

Rivers of New York (state)
Rivers of Otsego County, New York